is a private, co-educational high school in Nishi Izumi, Izumi, Kagoshima Prefecture, Japan. Izumi Chuo was founded in 1950 and renamed Izumi Chuo High School in 1985. There are students from farther away (including Kumamoto Prefecture); so there are dormitories for both female and male students. Students usually refer to Izumi Chuo High School as "Chuo" or Izumi Chuo" outside of school.

Departments 
General Department
 General Studies
Students focus on general education and sports.
 Liberal Arts Studies
Students focus on both sports and studies, especially English studies.
The Liberal Art Studies Department has been hosting exchange students since 1988.
Most of the exchange students have been from Australia.
The 2nd-year class has a 12-day class trip to Australia (Brisbane and sometimes Sydney) each year.
The Liberal Arts Department also has a partnership with Santa Monica College in the U.S.
In the early 1990s, the Liberal Arts Department hosted faculty members from Santa Monica College.
 Special Advanced Studies
Students rarely join any other clubs, for they focus most of their time at school (including club time) on studying.

Department of Health and Welfare
 Health and Welfare Studies
Students study a branch of nursing.

Nursing Department
 Foundation Courses (high school)
 Specialized Courses (post-high school, 2-year program)

Clubs

Clubs with honors 
  Brass Band Club
The building that holds brass band was rebuilt in 2006.
 Baseball
 Men's Soccer
 Women's and Men's Judo

Other clubs (incomplete list)
 Women's and Men's Basketball
 Women's and Men's Tennis
 Women's and Men's Badminton
 Women's and Men's Ping Pong
 Archery
 Softball
 English Club
 Art Club
 Cooking Club

Gallery

See also 
 List of high schools in Japan
 Chronology of high schools in Kagoshima 
 List of High Schools that offer nursing training

References

External links 
 

High schools in Kagoshima Prefecture
Educational institutions established in 1950
Private schools in Japan
1950 establishments in Japan